The Statue of Saint Procopius is installed in a niche of the wall of the homestead K rotundě 16/3 (former canon's court) at Vyšehrad, Prague, Czech Republic.

The statue has a modern appearance; its sculptor and the year of its origin are not declared at the statue. The statue is mentioned in the description of the Vyšehrad Fortress in the state register of cultural monuments among elements which are possible candidates to be included into protection. However, no further details are stated.

References

External links

 

Outdoor sculptures in Prague
Sculptures of men in Prague
Statues in Prague